Don't Sleep in the Subway is an album by American jazz saxophonist Johnny Hodges featuring performances with a big band recorded in 1967 and released on the Verve label.

Reception

The Allmusic site awarded the album 3 stars stating "The orchestrations are uneven, but Johnny Hodges is uniformly sharp".

Track listing
All compositions by Johnny Hodges except as indicated
 "Don't Sleep in the Subway" (Tony Hatch, Jackie Trent) - 3:20
 "The Wonder of You" (Duke Ellington, Johnny Hodges, Don George) - 2:44
 "Serenade in Blue" (Frank Signorelli, Mitchell Parish) - 3:08
 "Everytime She Walks" (Jimmy Jones) - 3:47
 "Wisteria" (Jones, Ellington) - 2:47
 "Heel Kickin'" - 3:38
 "You've Changed" (Bill Carey, Carl T. Fischer) - 2:51
 "Some Fun" - 3:40
 "Eydie-Dee Dee" - 4:27

Personnel
Johnny Hodges - alto saxophone
Ernie Royal, Snooky Young - trumpet
Bill Berry - trumpet, vibraphone
Tony Studd - bass trombone
Jerome Richardson, Frank Wess - flute, clarinet, alto saxophone
Jimmy Hamilton - clarinet, tenor saxophone
Danny Bank - baritone saxophone, clarinet
Hank Jones - piano
Everett Barksdale - guitar
Milt Hinton - double bass
Grady Tate - drums
Jimmy Jones - arranger, conductor

References

Johnny Hodges albums
1967 albums
Albums produced by Esmond Edwards
Verve Records albums